Ana Gabriela López Ferrer (born 22 September 1994) is a Mexican weightlifter. She won the bronze medal in the women's 55kg event at the 2022 World Weightlifting Championships held in Bogotá, Colombia. She also won the bronze medal in the women's 55 kg event at the 2019 Pan American Games held in Lima, Peru. She represented Mexico at the 2020 Summer Olympics in Tokyo, Japan.

Career 

In 2017, she competed in the women's 53kg event at the World Weightlifting Championships held in Anaheim, United States. At the 2018 World Weightlifting Championships in Ashgabat, Turkmenistan, she competed in the women's 55kg event. She also competed in the women's 55kg event at the 2019 World Weightlifting Championships held in Pattaya, Thailand.

She represented Mexico at the 2020 Summer Olympics in Tokyo, Japan. She finished in 9th place in the women's 55kg event.

Major results

References

External links 
 

Living people
1994 births
Mexican female weightlifters
Weightlifters at the 2019 Pan American Games
Medalists at the 2019 Pan American Games
Pan American Games bronze medalists for Mexico
Pan American Games medalists in weightlifting
Weightlifters at the 2020 Summer Olympics
Olympic weightlifters of Mexico
World Weightlifting Championships medalists
People from Xalapa
Sportspeople from Veracruz
Sonora Institute of Technology alumni
21st-century Mexican women